Epimedium alpinum, the alpine barrenwort, is a species of flowering plant in the genus Epimedium, native to the mountains of Italy, Austria, the former Yugoslavia, and Albania, and introduced into central Europe. A dwarf perennial suitable for rock gardens, it was jocularly said by John Lindley to be "known only in the gardens of botanists". Its hybrid with E.grandiflorum, Epimedium × rubrum, has gained the Royal Horticultural Society's Award of Garden Merit.

References

alpinum
Flora of Europe
Taxa named by Carl Linnaeus
Plants described in 1753